Megatron is a fictional character and the main antagonist of the Transformers media franchise produced by American toy company Hasbro and Japanese toy company Takara Tomy. Megatron is the cruel and tyrannical leader of the Decepticons, a faction of sentient, war-mongering robotic lifeforms that seeks to conquer their home planet of Cybertron and the rest of the known universe. He serves as the archenemy of Optimus Prime, the leader of the rival Autobot faction. As with all Cybertronians, Megatron has the ability to transform between his robot form and various vehicles or weapons. His alternate modes have ranged from a Walther P38 handgun, a particle-beam weapon, a telescopic laser cannon, and a Cybertronian jet, depending on which continuity he is depicted in.

Megatron's most consistent origin portrays him as having risen up from being an oppressed worker to a gladiatorial champion who took the legendary name of one of the original Thirteen Primes—Megatronus—as his own. He shortened his name when he became a political revolutionary who attempted to reform Cybertron's corrupt governing body and called for an end to its decrepit caste system. As the mentor of the young Orion Pax, Megatron preached that freedom of self-determination was the right of all sentient beings. When Megatron grew corrupted by his power, Orion would utilize his teachings against him as Optimus Prime. In most incarnations, Megatron would eventually meet his demise at Optimus' hands, only to later be resurrected as Galvatron.

Megatron has become one of the franchise's most iconic characters and a widely recognized villain in popular culture. The character's popularity has seen him appear on a variety of merchandise, such as toys, clothing and collectible items, theme park attractions, and be referenced in a number of media. He has been adapted in live-action, animated, and video game incarnations, having been voiced by actors including Frank Welker, Corey Burton, and Hugo Weaving.

Thirteen Original Primes

The original Megatronus, better known as the Fallen, was one of the original Thirteen Primes created by Primus. Megatronus betrayed his creator by siding with Primus' dark twin, the malevolent planet-eater Unicron. In the final battle between Primus and Unicron, Megatronus fell victim to the same fate as his master, sucked through a black hole into another dimension. However, while Unicron emerged in another universe, the Fallen was not so fortunate, finding himself trapped in the "underspace" between dimensions. Another being addressed simply as Megatron is an apocalyptic figure said to bring about death and destruction through alteration of the time stream. Possible interpretations in the book of him are "Alpha and Omega" and "The Great Dragon".

The Fallen made his first appearance in the second volume of Transformers: The War Within. The character appears as the main antagonist in the second live action film, Transformers: Revenge of the Fallen, the 2009 sequel to the 2007 Transformers movie, voiced by Tony Todd. Director Michael Bay described him as "apocalyptic". He has the ability to teleport and generate a shockwave upon reappearance. He wields a spear as his weapon and has the ability of telekinesis. Megatronus is also mentioned as one of Thirteen in Transformers: Exodus and later appeared as the main antagonist in the first-season finale of Transformers: Robots in Disguise, voiced by Gil Gerard.

Megatronus's history would be retconned in Transformers: The Covenant of Primus, which depicts him in more tragic light and omits his involvement with Unicron. Megatronus was one of the original thirteen Primes. Megatronus commissioned Solus Prime to create the Requiem Blaster. It's revealed that Megatronus and Solus Prime were in love, but that Megatronus was prone to bursts of temper and aggression due to his pride and secret shame at being a necessary counter-force to balance out light and darkness within the Thirteen. Following the War of the Primes, he exiled himself from Cybertron after unintentionally murdering Solus Prime.

Generation 1
Megatron is the founder of the Decepticon uprising and their most feared leader. Bob Budiansky, the writer for the Marvel Comics series, stated that originally Hasbro took issue with the name, saying it sounded too frightening. Budiansky responded that as the lead villain, that was the point. Hasbro later agreed with his reasoning, and approved the name "Megatron". Budiansky has said in interviews that it is a portmanteau of electronic and megaton.

Megatron is able to transform into a Walther P38, delivering more focused energy blasts than he could in his robotic form. He can adjust his size and mass as he transforms, to comfortably allow another Transformer or even a human being to wield him. His robot form has an arm-mounted fusion cannon. He can retract and replace his right hand with energy flail. He can fire electrical blasts from his hands, laser blasts from his eyes, and can reprogram computers with a port in his head.

Megatron is a Decepticon, one of the lineal descendants of the military hardware robots created by the Quintessons on their factory world of Cybertron. Following a war between the Decepticons and the other robot race, the Autobots, the Decepticons were defeated by the Autobots' invention of transformation, which allowed them the advantage of stealth. The Autobot victory in the war began the Golden Age of Cybertron, but a viper lurked within this paradise, as the Decepticons too eventually developed transformation, leading to the creation of Megatron. Gathering a small number of troops together, Megatron made a small strike on an outer city, killing the current Autobot leader. However, this event was not made public knowledge, and young robots like the naive Orion Pax still looked up to Megatron and his followers because of their new robot-mode flight powers. Orion soon learned the error of his ways when Megatron duped him into allowing him access to Energon warehouses, and Megatron  near-fatally wounded him in a scuffle. However, the ancient Autobot, Alpha Trion, reconstructed Pax into a battle hardy configuration at the behest of the Aerialbots, who had been flung back in time by Megatron. Orion, rechristened as Optimus Prime, became leader of the Autobots and Megatron's sworn opponent as the civil war erupted again.

The Decepticons had conquered Cybertron by 2005 in the feature film, The Transformers: The Movie. After hearing of an Autobot supply run to Earth in order to procure a larger amount of Energon in the hopes of mounting a full scale assault to reclaim the planet, Megatron led Decepticon forces to commandeer the Autobots' shuttle and kill the crew, and proceeded with an attack on Autobot City on Earth. Optimus Prime confronted Megatron in an epic and internecine fight, in which they both sustained mortal injuries. As he was about to kill Prime, Megatron was defeated and would have died if he had not been saved by Soundwave. On the Decepticons' return journey to Cybertron, Megatron, who was still functional, was jettisoned into space along with the fallen Skywarp, Thundercracker, and the Insecticons, in order to reduce Astrotrain's mass to reach Cybertron. The end seemed to be near for Megatron—but it was not to be, as he was summoned by Unicron, who made him an offer—in return for Megatron's service, he would give him a new body and new troops to command. Facing destruction as an alternative, Megatron agreed to Unicron's offer, and was rebuilt with a new body and rechristened to Galvatron. Commanded by Unicron to destroy the Autobot Matrix of Leadership, Galvatron first returned to Cybertron to settle a score with Starscream, who had set him adrift in space and was now being crowned as the new Decepticon leader in a pompous ceremony. Demonstrating his new power, Galvatron annihilated Starscream with a single blast from his new cannon mode. The other Decepticons quickly accepted Galvatron as their leader.

Unicron's subsequent consumption of Cybertron's moons enraged Galvatron, but when Unicron mentally tortured him to put him in his place, Galvatron submitted. Leading another attack on Autobot City, he pursued Ultra Magnus and the Autobots to the Planet of Junk, where he seized the Matrix from Ultra Magnus, and attempted to use its power against Unicron. Unable to open the Matrix, Galvatron was powerless as Unicron transformed and attacked Cybertron with his bare hands, swallowing Galvatron as well. Shortly thereafter, a group of Autobots entered Unicron's body, where young Autobot Hot Rod encountered the Decepticon leader. Although Galvatron initially proposed an alliance with the Autobot against Unicron, he was once again tortured mentally by Unicron, who ordered him to destroy Hot Rod or face his own obliteration. To end the torture, Galvatron agreed and engaged Hot Rod in battle. Galvatron quickly gained the upper hand over the smaller Autobot. However, when Hot Rod seized the Matrix from Galvatron, he was reformatted into the much larger and more powerful Rodimus Prime. Rodimus defeated Galvatron and hurled him through Unicron's armor and into the void of space, before unleashing the power of the Matrix and destroying Unicron.

Later, Galvatron's Unicron-created minions, Cyclonus, Scourge and the Sweeps, set out to find their leader in order for him to lead the Decepticons back to victory. Using the information stored in Unicron's memory banks, they traced Galvatron to the planet Thrull. They found him immersed in a pool of lava-like plasma, and rescued him only to discover that the plasma had seeped into Galvatron's head casing and damaged his "metaprocessor", resulting in insanity. Nevertheless, the Decepticon empire was reestablished with Galvatron as the new leader. Still, Decepticons at times questioned his ability to lead; on one occasion, Cyclonus tricked Galvatron into receiving therapy on a planet where the mentally ill are treated.

When the Hate Plague began to sweep the universe, Galvatron was the only Decepticon who was able to avoid infection initially, teaming up with the resurrected Optimus Prime in order to recover a protective alloy that would shield the user from the plague's effects. He later became infected in the process of recovering the alloy, but was eventually cured along with all the other victims of the plague when Prime unleashed the power of the Matrix. The same process also cured Galvatron's insanity; he declared a cease-fire and shook Prime's hand, saying that he had earned his respect.

A year later, the short truce ended as Galvatron formulated a new plan. Although appearing coherent throughout the scheme, it was shown to be his most insane - rejecting notions of conquest, Galvatron now sought the destruction of both Cybertron and Earth. To this end, he dispatched his troops to Cybertron, in order to recover the key to the Plasma Energy Chamber. Failing to do so, a plasma energy explosion sent the Autobots — possessing the key — and his Decepticons to the planet Nebulos. While Decepticons led by Cyclonus sought to reclaim the key and return to Cybertron, he led the main attack force on Cybertron. Victorious on Cybertron, Galvatron had a colossal rocket engine constructed on the planet's surface, which propelled Cybertron into Earth's orbit (for the second time during the Transformers television series). His troops soon returned from Nebulos with the key, but in their absence, they had become binary-bonded to the planet's organic inhabitants as Headmasters and Targetmasters - a union which Galvatron thoroughly objected to, threatening to destroy the Nebulons immediately. Nebulon leader Lord Zarak, however, was able to stay Galvatron's hand, as he now possessed the Plasma Energy Chamber key. Galvatron then used the key to open the chamber, releasing the energy with the intent of driving the Earth's sun supernova, destroying both planets. Galvatron and the other Decepticons then attempted to flee inside Scorponok, but a tendril of plasma energy struck the giant craft, sending the Decepticons hurtling off into deep space. Spike Witwicky and the Autobot-allied Nebulons were subsequently able to foil Galvatron's scheme and use the excess solar energy to re-energize Cybertron, restoring its Golden Age. Despite that, Galvatron was not finished yet, proclaiming that the Decepticons would build a more powerful planet and use it to rule the galaxy. However, as this was the end of the American cartoon series, Galvatron's future plans never came to light.

While the American series ended with the three-part miniseries, "The Rebirth", featuring Galvatron's scheme with the Plasma Energy Chamber, it was decided in Japan to continue the series in a different direction. Disregarding the events of "The Rebirth", they began to produce a collection of animated series exclusive to Japan, the first of which was Transformers: The Headmasters, taking place a year after the Hate Plague incident. Of all the previously seen Transformers to appear in Headmasters, Galvatron received the most attention, effectively remaining as the Decepticons' leader for 26 out the series 35 episodes, until he was entombed in ice by the Autobot Headmasters.

Other appearances
Megatron appeared in the short-lived online Universe cartoon, where he plots to steal gasoline in order to produce Energon. Notably, his alternate mode of a jet is exactly the same as that of Cyclonus, and he incorporates several elements from his live-action movie design, such as both arms fusing together to form his fusion cannon. Megatron made a cameo in the pilot of the Transformers: Animated series on a historical video being viewed by Optimus Prime. This historical video was stock footage from the original animated series.

Books
Megatron appeared in the following books:
 The Revenge of the Decepticons written by Suzanne Weyn and published by Marvel Books in 1984.
 The 1985 audio story Sun Raid and Satellite of Doom.
 The Ladybird Transformers audio books Autobots' Lightning Strike, Laserbeak's Fury, Megatron's Fight for Power and Autobots Fight Back.
 The 1985 Find Your Fate Junior book called Dinobots Strike Back by Casey Todd.
 The 1985 Find Your Fate Junior book called Battle Drive by Barbara Siegel and Scott Siegel.

Megatron was featured in the 1993 Transformers: Generation 2 coloring book "Decepticon Madness" by Bud Simpson.

Comics

Japanese manga
In the Japanese manga "Big War" #2, the Autobots Rodimus Prime, Grimlock, Kup and Wheelie, along with their human allies Spike Witwicky and Daniel Witwicky send Computron into battle against Galvatron's new warrior combiner Abominus. The Terrorcons spit "corrosive control liquid" against Computron, taking control of him and turning him into a Decepticon. Spike luckily uses his new Exosuit to free Computron with "defense spray." Defeated, Galvatron retreats.

In the Transformers Manga #5, Galvatron and his Decepticons attacked the Prime Energy Tower. Galvatron ordered the Decepticons to form Menasor, Devastator and Bruticus and attack. Rodimus Prime counted this move by ordering in Superion, Omega Supreme and Defensor. Galvatron then ordered in Predaking, knowing that Sky Lynx was elsewhere and couldn't counter them. Rodimus ordered the Omnibots to attack Predaking's legs. Tripping up the giant he fell into the other Decepticon giants, winning the day for the Autobots.

Galvatron also appeared in a series of Japanese Manga comic strips set in continuity with the Headmasters series, where he attempted to destroy the Autobots with such schemes as creating his own army of Megatron clones, attempting to destroy Fortress Maximus and creating a hybrid of the original Megatron and Optimus Prime named Guiltor to destroy Rodimus Prime, although he ended up teaming up with his enemy to destroy it after it went rogue.

After Galvatron's seeming destruction in Headmasters this was all that was heard from Galvatron in the animated continuity for several years until the Battlestars: The Return of Convoy storyline (although not animated in itself, consisting of one chapter of manga and a selection of magazine spreads, it continues the storyline of the animated series). Buried and deactivated beneath the ice, Galvatron was recovered by the evil entity, Dark Nova, and reformatted into Super Megatron and later on as Ultra Megatron, going on to battle Star Convoy (a similarly reborn Optimus Prime).

Marvel Comics
In the world of Marvel Comics, Megatron begins by rising from his beginnings as a gladiator for the city-state of Tarn. Megatron and the Decepticons were the ones who developed transformation first, using it to begin the war against the Autobots, who fought back by mimicking the technology. Eventually, Cybertron was shaken from its orbit and fell into the path of an asteroid cluster. This would result in the Ark venturing out and then crashing into prehistoric Earth. Four million years later, in 1984, the Transformers were reawakened, and Megatron was defeated twice by Optimus Prime.

Megatron also featured prominently in Alignment, Simon Furman's take on what happened after the Generation 2 comic. In this story, Megatron was defeated for command of the Decepticons by Galvatron II (the U.S. comics version) and left for dead. Soundwave had revived his master. Megatron took a fleet of scavenged Warworlds to face the Liege Maximo. He was destroyed by Maximo's arm cannon; he unleashed an Energon-fueled blast that destroyed the Maximo. This sets up the Pax Cybertronia and the evolution of the Autobots and Decepticons into Maximals and Predacons. Whether this story is reconcilable with "Reaching the Omega Point", or whether it is even part of the Transformers canon is debatable.

TFcon comics
Megatron appeared in the 2006 TransformersCon voice actor play. Voices in the play were performed by a variety of volunteers and the actual voice actors attending the convention. The play itself should be considered unofficial but was notable because it featured several Transformers' original voice actors reprising their Transformers roles. In this voice actor play various Transformers from different timelines and realities were swept up in a repeating wave and transported along with Unicron to Earth. The Transformers included Generation 1 Tracks, Ariel, Cosmos and Megatron, Beast Wars Tarantulas, Robots in Disguise Sky-Byte and Beast Machines Tankor.

Dreamwave Productions
In the 21st Century reimagining of the Generation One Universe by Dreamwave Productions, Megatron was envisioned as an ancient gladiatorial combatant in the depths of Cybertron's underworld. As victory upon victory mounted, he began to realize that the games were nothing more than an elaborate attempt by the Cybertronian elders to hide the truth of Cybertron's history from the masses. When Megatron attempted to gain access to that knowledge through exploration and research, the Cybertronian elders attempted to have him assassinated—a plan that only resulted in stirring up even more discontent among Cybertronians which allowed Megatron to begin recruiting for the Decepticon movement. It is known that at one point Megatron attempted to recruit Grimlock as one of his inner circle, but the fellow gladiator refused the position, eventually joining the Autobots.

Megatron would also appear in Dreamwave's Transformers/G.I. Joe limited series. Unlike many of the other Transformers (who were given World War II vehicle alternate modes) Megatron would keep his basic Walther P38 handgun transformation, which was indeed a WWII German handgun. Forming an alliance with Cobra Commander due to their similar natures, Megatron nonetheless had a bitter personal rivalry with the tyrannical leader of the terrorist group Cobra, resulting in Megatron killing several of his troops and Cobra Commander having to use the Matrix to keep him in line. Later, Megatron refused to help the Commander as Bruticus tried to crush him, and allowed the Baroness to use him in gun mode to shoot the helpless Cobra Leader. After battling Optimus Prime, he was deactivated along with all the Transformers when Snake Eyes opened the Matrix.

Devil's Due Publishing
In the G.I. Joe vs. The Transformers comics printed by Devil's Due Publishing, Megatron was again among the Decepticons who crashed on in the Ark on Earth, but this time the Ark was discovered by Cobra, who reformatted the Autobots and Decepticons into weapons and vehicles for themselves called Battle Android Troopers controlled by the Tele-Vipers.

Megatron was locked in gun mode and kept by Cobra Commander. When Optimus Prime broke free of the controls, Megatron convinced his keeper to free him to fight Optimus. Wounded by the Autobots and a malfunctioning orbiting weapons system, Megatron was eventually defeated and believed destroyed. In reality much of his body remained and the U.S. government studied his workings to advance their own projects in military supercomputers.

In the third volume of the series, it was revealed that the U.S. Government had created the android Serpentor (or, as he is called here, Serpent O.R., standing for Organic Robot) using DNA from great historical war leaders and parts from Megatron. Serpentor succeeded where Megatron had failed and captured Optimus Prime. But Serpentor's exposure to the Matrix, possession by Cobra Commander and subsequent destruction left Megatron's legacy unfulfilled.

Fun Publications
The Transformers Classics comics published in the Official Transformers Collectors Club magazine is set in the Marvel Comics continuity, but in a timeline where the events of Generation 2 did not occur. The story occurs fifteen years after Megatron was presumed dead in the crash of the Ark. Megatron survived, and eventually upgraded his body (based on his Classics toy) and gathered many other Decepticons to him. Soundwave helped him in recovering the body of Astrotrain, who was then used to help locate the placement of other fallen Decepticons around the globe. Those who joined Megatron included Laserbeak, Ramjet, Ravage, Skywarp, Soundwave, Starscream and the Constructicons. Megatron also reactivated Thrust, Dirge and Thundercracker, but the three left him to join up with Bludgeon's troops — mostly because they couldn't work with Starscream, who had killed them once. Megatron's based his command from the wreck of the Ark in the Yukon, where he keeps the fallen body of Ratchet as a trophy and the severed, but living, head of Shockwave as an advisor.

In Crossing Over, when Skyfall and Landquake were presumed killed in the midst of a bloody Mini-Con civil war and attack by Unicron (set concurrently with the events of Transformers: Cybertron), they were, in actuality, transported across universes, from the world of the Unicron Trilogy into the Marvel Comics timeline. Unclear what had happened, they then found themselves staring down the barrel of Megatron's cannon. The two were saved when a group of Robot Hunters in battle suits attacked Megatron. Megatron slaughtered them, only to be confronted by a team of Autobots led by Optimus Prime. Skyfall went with the Autobots, while Landquake was taken by Megatron. Back at the Ark Landquake was interrogated and swore loyalty to Megatron. Scrapper detected an unusual Energon reading similar to that of Landquake and the Decepticons went to investigate, only to be confronted by the Autobots again.

In Games of Decepticon, Megatron detects the arrival of Bugbite's ship on Earth and sends Starscream, Skywarp and Ramjet to investigate. The Decepticons capture the Autobot spy Mirage. Returning to the Ark the Decepticons fall under the sway of Bugbite, who is using cerebro shells he stole from the Insecticon Bombshell. Megatron overcomes the shell and destroys Bugbite, as the Autobots under the command of Grimlock raid the Ark, destroying the computer and saving Mirage.

Megatron appears in At Fight's End talking to Ratchet. Megatron defeated Deathsaurus in combat for leadership of the Decepticons. He orders the combiner technology that he captures from Deathsaurus to be used on the Constructicons. Megatron then attacks Iacon with his new weapon, Devastator.

IDW Publishing
After Dreamwave's closure, the rights to the Transformers comics were taken over by IDW Publishing. IDW would take the opportunity to reboot the Transformers universe, including a revised origin for Megatron detailing how he came to power. Here, Megatron was originally a lowly Energon miner. He also formed an uneasy truce with Starscream.

In the IDW continuity, Megatron retains his role as supreme commander of the Decepticon army, although, in this continuity, they are no longer based on Cybertron (which was rendered uninhabitable by Thunderwing) and are fighting to conquer multiple worlds simultaneously. In fact, he barely seems to care about Cybertron and was willing to order its total destruction to stop the reanimated Thunderwing. Having now ingested Ore-13, Megatron is able to easily manage mass-displacement and thus turn into an Earth handgun (in Escalation #2), and the newfound power appears to have affected his actions—he personally went on the Brasnya mission and is confident enough to transform & battle Optimus in front of human witnesses, actions that Optimus finds out of character. His instability is also what leads the other Decepticons to awaken Starscream to stand up to him in Devastation. Eventually, after witnessing Bumblebee's willingness to sacrifice himself in order to stop the machinations of Shockwave, Megatron does the unthinkable and joins the Autobot cause. Megatron joins the crew of the Lost Light as its captain, though the bulk of the crew refuses to accept his change of heart and mutinies against him and his new Autobot friends. Megatron subsequently leads the outcasts into battle against the fanatical Decepticon Justice Division, but later is trapped in the alternate Functionist universe with his old mentor Terminus.

Megatron features prominently in Transformers: Regeneration One, Simon Furman's continuation of the original Marvel series in which the events of Generation 2 did not occur. Here, Megatron's lifeforce is still linked to Ratchet's, and after waking up on Earth in 1994, he has built what's left of Ratchet into a battle sled. Megatron also creates a zombie army from the mostly-Decepticon victims of the Underbase-empowered Starscream, while lobotomizing the still-living Starscream himself. Megatron proceeds to devastate the Earth, turning its nuclear arsenal against the population and destroys Fortress Maximus. The Wreckers discover what Megatron's done in the year 2012, prompting Optimus Prime to bring an assault team from Cybertron. Megatron is defeated when Kup destroys Ratchet, stopping Megatron in his tracks and permitting Optimus to destroy him once and for all.

In an interview, writer Simon Furman indicated that Galvatron made his first IDW Publishing appearance in The Transformers: Spotlight issue featuring Nightbeat. Unlike other incarnations, this Galvatron was not a recreated Megatron, but instead a separate Transformer from the Golden Age of Cybertron who is driven by a belief in having a great destiny. He was one of the crew of the lost Ark-1, which had secretly been seeking out (under orders from Nova Prime) an anomaly that was "a door to somewhere else... a dark mirror of the Matrix itself". Galvatron deliberately flew the Ark into the anomaly to find out the answers, thus marooning the crew in the Dead Universe. In the present day, he heads for Cybertron to obtain Thunderwing's body, destroying an alien observation station on the way. On Cybertron, Galvatron killed Leadfoot and easily overpowered Hound's unit, though he left them alive as a small act of defiance against his master. He made his first appearance in the main storyline in issue 3 of The Transformers: Devastation, being sent to Earth by Nemesis Prime to stop the Reapers from destroying it too soon. He turned the Reaper leader into a dead being able to kill by touch (like himself) and left it to decimate his fellow Reapers. Caught between this and the Ore-13 charged Decepticons, the Reapers were soon annihilated, and Galvatron left with the body of Sixshot. He then reported back to Prime, who made it clear in conversation with Jhiaxus that he was not unaware of Galvatron's rebellious ambitions.
 
As with the Marvel version of Galvatron, he is seemingly invincible and shrugs off powerful weapons. Unlike other incarnations of the character, he appears to be able to kill and decay others by touch and can even survive being shot through the head at close range by powerful weapons. In Devastation he is shown to be able to confer his touch of death onto others, turning the Reaper leader into an unwilling "giver of unlife". There are hints that he is not actually alive—after surviving his head shot he responded to a cry of "He's not dead!" by thinking "Wrong", and he has referred to the others in the Dead Universe as actually being dead: "I killed them".

Kiss Players
Although Megatron himself would not make an appearance in the Japanese exclusive Kiss Players line, he would nonetheless have a small role to play. When Rodimus Prime hurled Galvatron out of Unicron at the climax of The Transformers: The Movie, Galvatron hurtled through space, out of control, until he eventually crash-landed in Tokyo, devastating much of the city. Although comatose, Galvatron's Unicron-corrupted cells spread throughout Earth and fused with various creatures. The resultant hybrids, known as the Legion, bore a marked resemblance to Megatron and would menace the Earth Defense Command on several occasions.

Binaltech
Megatron is largely "off-screen" for most of the Binaltech saga, reflecting the absence of a Megatron figure in that toyline. Due to the interference of Ravage (the same future Ravage who appears in the Beast Wars), most of the events of the original animated feature do not transpire; most importantly the Battle of Autobot City does not occur, and Optimus Prime and Megatron do not have their final showdown, meaning that Optimus Prime does not die, and Megatron is never reformatted into Galvatron.

Unite Warriors
The Unite Warriors storyline—exclusive to Japan—introduced the character of Megaempress, a female Decepticon whose bio states that she was created from parts left over from Megatron's construction. She thus considers herself to be Megatron's wife—or the Transformer equivalent—and Empress of the Decepticons; whether Megatron views her in this fashion is unknown.

Beast Era

The Beast Wars and Beast Machines version of Megatron appears in the aforementioned parts of the Transformers animated series, toy lines, and multiverse. This Megatron is a separate character from his original Generation 1 counterpart, but the original pack-in mini-comic and biographies released with the earliest Beast Wars toys indicate that the character was supposed to be the original Megatron, in a new body. With the advent of the animated series, however, the fiction of Beast Wars was re-imagined and eventually applied to the toy line, establishing this Megatron as an independent character.

In the past, a few fans have referred to him as Megatron II to distinguish him from the original character of the same name; in the Japanese Transformers: Robot Masters series, he was named Beast Megatron for this purpose. Usually, however, he simply referred to as the Beast Wars Megatron. His ultimate goal is the conquest of Cybertron, where he was branded a criminal. Few pieces of information exist about Megatron before the Beast Wars. The Japanese Beast Wars II toy catalogue claims that he had battled and lost to Galvatron (the villain of that series) in the past, while the 2006 BotCon comics claimed he was previously a commander in the Predacon army who had developed many of the Predacons' tactics.

According to the 2007 CGI movie Theft of the Golden Disk, Megatron was Cryotek's pupil. It was Cryotek who masterminded the theft of the Golden Disk, but Megatron betrayed his mentor and fled Cybertron with his prize, leaving Cryotek and Dirge to be arrested by Maximals. In a 2010 interview with Shogun Gamer, David Kaye said that Megatron is the role he is more likely to be remembered for.

Three centuries after the end of The Great War, when Maximal and Predacon had risen to replace the Autobots and the Decepticons, one Predacon, in particular, was discontented with the Maximals' control of Cybertron following the Autobot victory in the war. Studying the ancient Cybertronian text called the Covenant of Primus, the Predacon took the name Megatron from a great destroyer of the same name that the book foretold (which may or may not have been also indirect homage to his namesake, the Decepticon Megatron). Searching for Energon to power his takeover bid, he stole the legendary artifact known as the Golden Disk, but discovered amongst its data more than the mere location of an Energon source—encoded onto the disk was a message from the original Megatron, which contained the coordinates of the prehistoric planet Earth. Using transwarp technology this would allow a user to travel back in time and alter history—specifically, to destroy Optimus Prime as he lay in stasis within the Ark, thereby preventing the Autobots from winning The Great War.

In Beast Machines, Megatron's personality underwent a change to become a much darker character. Losing many of his previous personality quirks, he developed a hatred of organics and free will, but oddly saw himself as a savior of Cybertron. His sense of humor vanished, replaced with "Machine Precision" and his plans had evolved to galactic conquest. He even developed some sense of honor, keeping his word to Rattrap in one case where he would have formerly taken advantage of an opponent. However, he still retained his strategic brilliance and manipulative abilities, outwitting the Maximals and other enemies with his plans on nearly every occasion.

Comics

3H Enterprises
Megatron's sudden development of a transformation-freezing virus, spark-extraction and Vehicon technology and drones went without explanation in the animated series, with the large time gap between his return and the Maximals' left to serve as a grey area in which these innovations occurred. The comics exclusive to the BotCon convention, however, shone some light on this period of time and revealed that upon his return to Cybertron, Megatron met his former mentor, Cryotek. Cryotek offered to free Megatron of his beast mode by transferring most of it to himself, only to have the transfer send him into a period of stasis lock. Megatron went into seclusion, using Cryotek's plundered inventions to develop the technology that he used to enslave Cybertron.

Megatron was intended to appear in an upgraded form during the Universe storyline, but the line was canceled before this could come to pass. However, an alternate version was mentioned as hailing from a universe where he was overthrown and killed by Obisidian after taking control of Cybertron with his Vehicons. "Ask Vector Prime" later expanded on this storyline, revealing that in this universe Starscream's Spark had possessed Waspinator and destroyed the Maximals, while the Quantum Surge was caused when Megatron tricked Blackarachnia into destroying the Vok weapon in orbit around prehistoric Earth. "Waspscream" then overthrew Megatron and killed him, Scorponok, and Inferno, later doing the same to Silverbolt after he left the Predacons. However, during the crew's journey back to Cybertron, Megatron would escape and beat the others back to the planet, taking it over as he had in Beast Machines.

Waspscream, Tarantulas, Protoform X, and Terrorsaur would escape Megatron's transformation virus and be reformatted into techno-organic forms by the Oracle, becoming a resistance force that opposed Megatron and his generals: the liberated Inferno and the reprogrammed/reformatted Silverbolt and Scorponok, who became Jetstorm and Tankor. Waspscream's forces later saved Silverbolt, and the threat of other resistance groups soon pushed Megatron to recruit Obsidian as a new general; however, without Strika to serve as his counterbalance Obsidian turned against Megatron and overthrew him. This pushed Inferno into the Predacon camp, and after Obsidian and Tankor were drawn into the Universe War by Unicron Waspscream and the other rebel forces reclaimed Cybertron.

Dreamwave Productions
Megatron's earliest fictional depiction in comics was in a two-part short story told in Dreamwave's Transformers: More Than Meets The Eye series of character profiles. The tale started and finished the series, showing a mysterious figure (who would be revealed at the story's close as Megatron) and his accomplice accessing the supercomputer Vector Sigma through a node in an ancient Autobot library and viewing the profiles of the Autobots and Decepticons of the Great War (in reality the character profiles of the series). As the accomplice dispatched a Maximal security agent his leader obtained the Golden Disk and announced he wished to be addressed as Megatron from now on, implying he took the name after viewing the profile of the original Megatron.

In addition to his surprise appearance in Dreamwave's More Than Meets The Eye series Megatron was also set to appear in Dreamwave's unpublished Beast Wars comic. Although the company's bankruptcy meant that no issues were released, released art and information have revealed that the second issue would have dealt with Megatron's trial on Cybertron at the hands of Magmatron.

IDW Publishing
IDW Publishing's 2006 comic book, Beast Wars: The Gathering, saw Megatron's old rival from Cybertron, Magmatron, travel back to the time of the Beast Wars (shortly after Megatron's failed attempt at killing Optimus Prime) at the behest of the Tripredacus Council. Activating all the remaining stasis pods on the planet, Magmatron quickly assembled a Predacon army of his own, including a reanimated Ravage. Although Magmatron had ambitions to stage a coup like Megatron, he did not want to reveal his intentions to the Tripredacus Council yet and aimed to capture Megatron for them as his mission required, to divert suspicion. Revealing himself to Megatron, the two would-be tyrants battled, but Megatron was captured when Magmatron's lackeys Iguanus and Drill Bit managed to knock Megatron out. Magmatron aimed to send him back to Cybertron, but due to the intervention of Razorbeast, Optimus Minor and Grimlock, Magmatron was sent back to Cybertron instead. Razorbeast left the unconscious Megatron on Earth, fearing an alteration to the time stream if he captured him.

Megatron's presence would be felt in IDW's second Beast Wars series as well, as Ravage (resurrected as a Transmetal by Magmatron) aimed to capture Razorbeast's chronal armband, which would allow him to interfere with the "main" timestream (the Beast Wars of the TV show). He planned to free Megatron from his imprisonment on the Autobot shuttle and ally with him to kill all the Maximals on the planet. His plan was thwarted by Razorbeast. However, in the very last panel of the series, Megatron is seen overlooking a ravaged Cybertron, presumably having just arrived from his long transwarp journey before his Maximal rivals.

Megatron had a biography printed in the Beast Wars Sourcebook by IDW Publishing. In 2016, he also appeared in the "Dawn of the Predacus" comic released at the BotCon convention that year, with IDW publishing the comic in place of Fun Publications. In this storyline, set some 300 years before the Beast Wars, Megatron's form—a Retool of Robots in Disguise Megatron/Galvatron—is the result of having his body reconstructed with Techno-Organic Tri-Malteranium, a technology also known as "TM3." In this story, Megatron is a Decepticon commander who, after learning of Galvatron's death and the Tripredacus Council's resolution to call a cease-fire, orders his forces—including Predaking—to attack. His force is then engaged by Magnaboss, but after learning of Predaking's defeat he is stunned by Ravage, and later disciplined for failing to follow the orders of the Tripredacus Council.

Fun Publications
Megatron was featured in the 2006 BotCon tale Timelines: Dawn of Futures Past, which picked up where the Dreamwave story left off. Much more of the background surrounding his theft of the Golden Disk artifacts was revealed. A feared general in the Predacon army, he went rogue from the Predacons after the signing of the Pax Cybertronia—a peace treaty between the Maximal and Predacon factions—and took the name of Megatron. He swiftly gathered a crew of like-minded individuals and, while Waspinator and Terrorsaur stole a ship, he, Dinobot and Scorponok stole the disk, battling the guards and destroying one, leaving the other to commandeer a ship to pursue them. Picked up by their ship, they fled and were pursued by two ships—one of which was the Axalon. Tarantulas was able to decode enough information from the Golden Disk to set a course through transwarp space. With a little help from Laserbeak and Buzzsaw (secretly sent by Divebomb to ensure Megatron's plan to change history succeeded) they destroyed one of their pursuers, and the newly christened Darkside fled into Transwarp space, with the Axalon in pursuit—thus beginning the Beast Wars.

To marry the visual appearance of Megatron's pre-Beast form seen in the first episode of the Beast Wars animated series (indeed, Megatron was the only character whose entire body was depicted, albeit briefly, prior to reformatting into a beast mode) with the toy of the character available exclusively at the convention, the story notes that Megatron adopts a detachable suit of armor that transforms into a missile tank, similar to a Pretender Shell or Ultra Magnus's outer armor in Dreamwave's series. The tank is his toy; the profile is given for the character in the widespread release of the comic notes that his original body transforms into a hover tank. Notably, Timelines presents a slightly different version of the disk's theft to the story presented in Dreamwave comics. In Timelines, Megatron seems to already be known to other characters by that name, whereas in Dreamwave's story, he only takes the name after taking possession of the disk. Whether the two are reconcilable is unknown.

Megatron appeared in the 2008 BotCon voice-actor play "Bee in the City", voiced by David Kaye. After losing Optimus Prime and Sari to the Transtech incarnation of Shockwave, Bumblebee and Flareup meet Megatron, who goes by the name of "Joe" to avoid any attraction. Learning of the Allspark key on Sari's person, Megatron offers his aid. Once Bumblebee frees his friends, Megatron reveals himself as he uses the key to bring an army to life. However, when his army realizes the consequence of their coming to being within Transtech Cybertron, a mutiny ensures as Megatron is dragged off while vowing revenge.

"Ask Vector Prime" would also introduce an alternate version of Megatron created by the events of the Binaltech storyline who later invaded the Robots in Disguise universe and was transformed into the villainous "Megahead Megatron". Establishing a horde of Vehicons as his original counterpart had, he proceeded to plunge Cybertron into a Spark War, with Mirage as one of his many victims. However, he was eventually defeated due to the actions of the Binaltech Alternity in dispatching a crew of similarly created Maximals—including Air Attack Optimus Primal—to challenge his efforts. However, his legacy would continue to plague that universe, as his associate Cryotek would use the Transwarp technology Megatron contributed to their efforts to launch a campaign across time and space.

Megatron's story continued in the pages of the biography printed by Fun Publications for the 25th-anniversary Optimus Primal toy. Even his death at the conclusion of Beast Machines would not be the end of Megatron's villainy. Due to the inextricable link that had been forged between himself and Optimus Primal when Cybertron was reformatted, Primal's return to life to lead the "Children of Primus" against the machinations of Unicron meant that Megatron was also brought back to the land of the living. This time, however, the two old enemies found themselves in an uneasy alliance, traveling from universe to universe to wherever the multiversal conflict had spread. While this storyline would never play out, the design used for Megatron's Universe form—a remold/redeco of Robots in Disguise Megatron—would later see use in the "Dawn of Predacus" storyline for BotCon 2016.

TFcon comics
Megatron appears among the characters in Re-Unification, the 2010 TFCon voice actor play prelude comic. He was featured in the Beast Wars Transformers Mutating Card Game by Parker Brothers.

Beast Wars Second
In the interim between the first and second seasons of the Beast Wars animated series, the Beast Wars II anime was produced in Japan to fill the gap, and produced a feature film entitled Beast Wars II: Lio Convoy's Close Call! In this film, the Predacons of the series discover a mysterious transwarp device. The Predacons' leader, Galvatron, attempted to use the time-and-space-warping gate to summon a "Megatron" to his aid. It is unclear whether he was searching for the original Megatron or the Predacon who went by the same name, but regardless, Galvatron's brother Gigastorm screwed up the calculations and instead summoned the titanic Majin Zarak, whom Galvatron proudly declared to be far superior to Megatron.

Transformers: Robot Masters
The short-lived Transformers: Robot Masters line released exclusively in Japan saw Megatron transported through the mysterious "Blastizone" to Earth in the early 21st century, where he sided with the Decepticons, currently led by Starscream after the disappearance of Megatron. Dubbed "Beast Megatron" to distinguish him from his predecessor, Megatron bested Starscream and took leadership of the Decepticons until the original Megatron returned in the form of Reverse Convoy, and the two Megatrons merged their energies to create the "Double Megatron Tornado". This power, however, was thwarted by the "Triple Convoy Tornado Link Attack" formed from the energy of Optimus Prime, Optimus Primal and Lio Convoy.

Oddly, the Robot Masters series depicted Megatron standing as tall as original Decepticon characters, when Maximals and Predacons were much smaller. Additionally, he is capable of robot-mode flight and breathes fire in dinosaur mode, none of which he could do in the Beast Wars TV series.

Robots in Disguise

This version of Megatron (known as Gigatron in Japan) is a six-changer, powerful enough to transform into five additional modes besides his robot form—twin-headed dragon, bat-gargoyle creature, race car, spaceship and claw (GigaDragon, GigaBat, GigaFormula, GigaJet and GigaHand in Japanese). Each form has its own different frightening capabilities, making Megatron a very unstable and unpredictable fighter. Unlike his namesake, Megatron would often sit back from a conflict and allow his subordinates to do the dirty work. Like his counterparts, he is arrogant, but unlike them, he also was incompetent, as most of his schemes were badly planned and badly executed. Upon his upgrade into Galvatron, he gains additional forms, and gains the ability to absorb energy from other lifeforms.

A Predacon warlord before coming to Earth, Megatron is believed to have decimated numerous planets in his quest for energy. Optimus stated that Megatron left entire planets as "lifeless barren rocks". Needing ever more energy, Megatron targeted Earth's energy; to that end, he kidnapped the human energy-research expert, Doctor Kenneth Onishi, using his psycho-probe to drain information on Earth's energy sources from his mind. But even his subordinates were unaware that Megatron had a greater scheme in motion. In the original Car Robots series, the character was developed as a new, unique villain character called Gigatron; however, the name "Megatron" was used in the U.S. dub due to recognition, as well as maintaining ownership of the trademark. In Korea, the character has been established as being the same character as Beast Wars II Galvatron. In this version of the series, each of Gigatron's modes had its own personality.

Comics

Dreamwave Productions
The character of RiD Megatron made one appearance in Dreamwave comics 'Summer Special' issue before the company went under, sending his bickering lieutenants Scourge and Sky-Byte to steal a nuclear generator while he led the other Decepticons and Predacons to distract the Autobots. There was a contest in the issue as to whether RiD or Beast Wars would be the next Dreamwave comic series, which Beast Wars won. But Dreamwave went bankrupt before the series began.

IDW Publishing
Gigatron appears in the Generation 1 IDW Publishing series that focuses on the Autobot Drift in design completely based on his Robots in Disguise appearance, but as a character separate from G1 Megatron.

Other Versions
"Ask Vector Prime" would introduce additional versions of this Megatron/Galvatron, both associating with other tyrants. One version would join forces with the Predacon Cryotek, who reformatted him into the Vehicon Megabolt to enable him to control Fortress Maximus. Similarly, in another universe the tyrannical Megazarak would use the remains of the fallen Megatron to create an undead Megabolt to serve as his own controller for Fortress Maximus. However, before he could implement this plan, Megabolt and others of Megazarak's forces would be abducted by Unicron.

Unicron Trilogy

The Megatron of the "Unicron Trilogy" (Transformers: Armada, Transformers: Energon and Transformers: Cybertron) is the leader of the evil Decepticons in that universe of the Transformers mythology. In all three animated series, he is modified into Galvatron, reverting to his Megatron name at the beginning of each series. He is voiced by David Kaye, who also voiced the Beast Wars and Beast Machines version of Megatron.

Animated series
Megatron is a refined, focused general of the Decepticons. He is extremely cruel, ruthless and cunning as well as incredibly strong and intelligent. Only Optimus Prime can be compared with him in force. Megatron will stop at nothing in order to achieve his ultimate object, that is to say, to rule over the entire Universe, in the end. In Micron Legend (the Japanese version of Transformers: Armada) Megatron did not rename himself Galvatron when he received his power boost. Instead, he renames himself when he is reborn in Superlink, using the name "Galvatron" throughout the series. In the American version, on the other hand, he reverts to using the name Megatron again, changing it to Galvatron once more towards the end of the series.

Ten years later, Primus's plan to imprison Unicron's spark at the heart of the sun ultimately failed, leading the star to collapse, creating a black hole that threatened the existence of Cybertron, and the rest of the universe. Escaping his confinement within the sun, Megatron (now known as Master Megatron in Japan) enhanced his powers by merging his body with the remnants of Unicron's shattered form, increasing his power with the dark god's own. In this new form, Megatron became a Triple Changer with the ability to change into a monstrous racing vehicle and a Cybertronian jet plane. His primary weapons consist of two rear-mounted missile launchers and the ability to unleash energy streams from his palms in the shape of lightning bolts. In addition, he can call upon a Cyber Key to activate high-speed thrusters in vehicle mode, as well as a battle claw (named as Death Claw in Japan) in robot mode.

Megatron (in his Cybertron form) appears among the characters in Re-Unification, the 2010 TFcon voice actor play prelude comic.

Comics

Dreamwave Productions
The story of Megatron in the Armada comics would be similar to his animated counterpart, but with an expanded backstory. Attacking various Mini-Con villages to draw the Autobots away, Megatron's forces then declared war and invaded Cyber-City, crushing all resistance and announcing himself as its new leader. The Autobots returned but were no match for the Mini-Con-enhanced Decepticons. However, a handful of Mini-Cons broke into Decepticon headquarters, freed most of their comrades and evacuated the planet. Despite this setback, the few Mini-Cons that Megatron had left were still enough to allow him to conquer Cybertron.

Realizing that the threat Unicron posed was too great to be overcome on his own, Megatron agreed to co-operate with Optimus Prime by pooling resources. Megatron's Decepticons and the Autobots came to a truce for their final battle with Unicron. Megatron returned the Mini-Cons and joined the battle against Unicron, but secretly planned to let the Autobots die and then strike a bargain with Unicron. In the final battle with Unicron, Hot Shot, Red Alert and Scavenger attacked Megatron and knocked him into Unicron's mouth, where he was devoured alive.(Transformers: Armada #18 )

The origin of Energon Megatron was different in the Dreamwave comics. Although Megatron appeared dead, seemingly devoured by Unicron at the end of the Armada comics, it was later revealed that Megatron's mind was trapped within Unicron's bulk, where he existed undetected by Unicron, slowly building himself a new body. However, he could not move his consciousness into the body without being detected by Unicron.

Megatron would also appear in the Energon promotional comic. On Earth, Megatron, with the aid of Snowcat, Shockwave, Mirage and Demolishor, has cornered Optimus Prime and a wounded Hot Shot. Optimus refused to give up despite the odds. The other Autobot reinforcements were over ten minutes away when Wing Saber arrived. Megatron was shocked to learn the power of Optimus Prime when he Powerlink with Wing Saber and turned back all the Decepticons, and then Megatron himself. The Autobots then arrive and Optimus thanked Wing Saber for his help.

3H Enterprises
Plucked from his timeline by the power of Unicron immediately after building the Star Saber, Megatron was thrust together with Grimlock and Optimus Primal to battle Striker and Reptilion. Though his fate was not revealed in the line before its cancellation, "Ask Vector Prime" revealed the continued history of this incarnation of Armada Megatron. Having witnessed the evil of Unicron firsthand, he was more easily convinced to join forces with the Autobots, and did not have to witness Starscream's willingness to sacrifice himself. As a result, Starscream stepped up to fill his shoes after Megatron fell during the battle with Unicron, and the Autobots and Decepticons were more fully united when he reappeared as leader of the Terrorcons. Later, during the events of the Unicron Singularity, Megatron would be reformatted into Beast Megatron rather than Galvatron, and eventually face the similarly reformatted Beast Optimus in battle before being destroyed by Vector Prime's sword Rhisling.

"Ask Vector Prime" would also feature another alternate Armada Megatron, this one has become Galvatron, who attempted to form an alliance with Megazarak when that Decepticon arrived in his universe. However, after briefly working together and defeating the Autobots and Rodimus's Omnicons, Galvatron and his Decepticons were set upon by Megazarak and his Destructicons and destroyed.

Pack-in comics
In the second Transformers: Energon pack-in comic Prowl, Inferno and Landmine discover some hills on Earth that are rich with Energon and call in to Optimus Prime that they should put an Energon tower up. Optimus warns the Autobots that Decepticon activity has been scanned nearby. Megatron attacks with a horde of Divebomb Terrorcon clones. The Autobots attempt by fight back by having Mirage and Inferno Powerlinx while Landmine goes into brute mode, but they are overwhelmed when Insecticon Terrorcon hordes join in the attack. The Autobots retreat and Megatron takes the Energon for himself.

Transformers Cinematic Universe

In the 2007 live-action Transformers film, Megatron's alternate mode is a Cybertronian jet. The apparent explanation for the departure from his gun form is that director Michael Bay does not want to include any sort of size changing in the transformations, which the writers described as "cheating". (This significant change in size is known in Transformers fan communities as "mass shifting" and "mass displacement".) In one of the special features on the DVD, G1 Megatron's transformation was likened to Darth Vader turning into his own lightsaber to be wielded by another person. Additionally, Bay states in the DVD that Megatron's face was originally different from the one shown in the film, but he asked it to be redesigned due to fans reacting with strong opposition to it once Megatron's design was unveiled before the film was completed.

In the second film, Megatron gains an alternate mode, that of a Cybertronian flying tank. In the third film, Megatron receives another alternate mode, that being a Mack 10-wheeler tanker truck (a demented version of Optimus Prime's alternate mode) with a tarp which may act as a cowl to partially hide Megatron's face due to extensive damage he received in the second film. After his death in the third film, he returns in the fourth movie, where his consciousness possesses Galvatron, a man-made Transformer created by KSI, and transforms into a 2014 Freightliner Argosy cab over truck.

Actor Hugo Weaving provides the voice of Megatron in the first three films. His voice in the series seems to have been modulated to give it a deeper, growling tone as well as the other voice actors. The original voice of Megatron, Frank Welker, provides his voice for the 2007 and 2009 video games, the exclusive animated prequel and The Last Knight.

Like all characters in the film, Megatron was redesigned for purposes of realism and focus on the alien aspect of the Transformer race. However, he still retains some minor aspects of his Generation 1 design. As shown in the first film, he can transform his right hand into his iconic fusion cannon, and can also transform his right arm into a steel flail. In the second film, after Megatron's resurrection, his right arm could transform into a fusion cannon, coupled with a lobster claw-like blade/crushing device. In the third film, Instead of using a fusion cannon integrated into either of his arms, he uses a handheld version of it, which resembles a human shotgun, specifically a Lupara. In the fifth film, Megatron once again uses a fusion cannon integrated into his right arm as well as utilizing a handheld sword resembling a Congolese short sword.

Additionally, the magazine and the Movie Guide states he is powered by a self-regenerating dark matter power core. Hasbro has now said that Megatron officially stands 35 feet and weighs in at 5.7 metric tons.

BotCon Malaysia 2007 featured a parking space which was "Reserved for Megatron". A car parked in the space had been totaled, presumably by the Decepticon leader for taking his spot.

Films

Megatron appears in Transformers, the first film of the series. Several years after being discovered by Captain Archibald Witwicky, Megatron's frozen body is transported from the Arctic Circle to Hoover Dam to be guarded by Sector 7, a secret government organization that studies Non-Biological Extraterrestrials (N.B.E.), as well as other alien-related activities. Sector 7 Agent Seymour Simmons explains that the Earth's magnetic field may have interfered with Megatron's telemetry, causing him to crash during the Ice Age. He also explains that his technology was reverse-engineered, producing the world's modern technology. Megatron's location, as well as the AllSpark's, is located by a group of Decepticons led by Starscream. After sneaking into Hoover Dam Frenzy thaws out Megatron, who escapes outside and learns from Starscream that the humans and the Autobots have taken the Allspark. Megatron pursues the Autobots and their allies to Los Angeles, where he quickly (and rather brutally) disposes of Jazz before battling Optimus Prime. He overpowers Optimus and then pursues Sam Witwicky up a condemned building, attempting to taunt and threaten the human into giving him the AllSpark. Sam declines, prompting Megatron to knock the boy off the roof of the building with his flail. Optimus saves Sam and battles Megatron again. Towards the end of the battle as Megatron and Optimus are fighting, Blackout attempts to help Megatron kill Optimus Prime. However, Blackout is killed by Captain Lennox and his team. After being weakened by human combat jets, Megatron attempts to seize the AllSpark once again, only to have it shoved into his exposed spark chamber by Sam, killing him. Megatron's body is later dumped into the Laurentian Abyss, along with the other dead Decepticons.

Megatron returns in the sequel film, Transformers: Revenge of the Fallen. In this film, he is revealed to be the Fallen's disciple, and the second commander of the Decepticon armies, as the Fallen is the true commander of the Decepticons. Megatron is revived by Scalpel and the Constructicons with an AllSpark shard and now takes on the form of a Cybertronian winged tank. He then flies to the Nemesis, where he is greeted by Starscream (whom he briefly pummels and berates for deserting him on Earth). He then reunites with the Fallen, telling of the AllSpark's demise before being told by his master that its knowledge (which has been passed on to Sam) is the key for providing Energon, which is needed by the Decepticons in order to awaken their protoform armies. Sam, his girlfriend Mikaela Banes and his dorm mate Leo Spitz are abducted by Grindor into an abandoned factory where Megatron meets them. Pinning down Sam, threatening to torture him after acquiring what he needed, Megatron orders Scalpel to extract the Energon information from Sam's brain (ordering him to actually remove his brain), but they are quickly stopped by Optimus Prime. Megatron and Prime have a brief fight in the warehouse and then have a major battle in a forest, with Starscream and Grindor joining in. The fight ends with Megatron killing Prime by stabbing and shooting him with his fusion cannon, but then being forced to escape due to the intervention of Autobot reinforcements. Megatron then declares to Starscream that the Decepticons must reveal themselves to the humans in order to flush out Sam, and assists the Fallen in ordering the world's humans to find Sam and bring him to the Decepticons. Megatron and Starscream soon arrive in Egypt, and he commands his Decepticons (including several Constructicons and Starscream) to prevent Sam from getting the Matrix of Leadership to Optimus and retrieve it for the Fallen's machine. He then summons Devastator, who destroys the top part of the Great Pyramid of Giza, revealing the Star Harvester. The Fallen soon arrives after Devastator's destruction (see Devastator for more info.), and takes the Matrix of Leadership from a recently revived Optimus. Megatron then greets him but is blown away by an upgraded Optimus Prime (using the parts of Jetfire to fly). Megatron and his master then battle Optimus. In one brutal move, Optimus grabs Megatron's arm cannon and forces it to fire on Megatron's face, destroying half of it, and then slices off his right arm and shoots him through a wall with Jetfire's afterburners. After seeing the Fallen killed, Starscream advises that they should retreat. Megatron does so, but vows that the war isn't over.

Megatron returns in Transformers: Dark of the Moon. In the three years since the events of Revenge of the Fallen, Megatron has been hiding out in Africa healing his wounds, and taking care of the hatchlings. In the film, it is revealed that Megatron allied himself with Sentinel Prime in an attempt to revitalize Cybertron. Soundwave and Laserbeak inform him of the Autobot's discovery of the Ark ship on the moon, and orders them to kill their human allies. When Sentinel reveals his true intentions to the Autobots, Megatron arrives in Washington, D.C. to meet with him. After blasting the statue of Abraham Lincoln and using it as a throne, he witnesses Sentinel activate his Space Bridge to bring his Decepticon forces to Earth. During the invasion of Chicago, Sentinel violently demoralizes Megatron after the latter makes a suggestion of how they will rule Cybertron together after it has arrived through the Space Bridge. When Cybertron appears in the Earth's atmosphere, Megatron shows a rare example of sadness and regret. Towards the end of the battle, Megatron is convinced by Carly Spencer that Sentinel will take all of the power and credit for revitalizing Cybertron for himself. Angered, Megatron turns on Sentinel and severely damages him, declaring that the Earth is his planet to rule. When Cybertron's trip through the Space Bridge fails, Megatron slyly proposes a truce to Optimus, so long as he remains in charge of the Decepticon forces. But the Autobot leader, knowing that Megatron would not give in so easily, denies the offer and attacks him, overpowering him and ripping Megatron's head off with an axe, finally killing him. Shortly after, Optimus uses Megatron's shotgun to execute Sentinel.

In Transformers: Age of Extinction, it is revealed Megatron's mind is actually still alive and in stasis inside his severed head. A few years after the Battle of Chicago, Megatron's remains are acquired by KSI, who are attempting to forge their own Transformers with "transformium". Their CEO Joshua Joyce forces Brains to download information from Megatron's head, which the Decepticon leader silently allows so Joshua will gain the information needed to succeed, which will grant Megatron access to a new body. Megatron then infects and possesses the unit Galvatron. He then pretends to obey orders, only to finally defy his creators at the film's climax and accept his new identity and rebirth.

Megatron returns in Transformers: The Last Knight, reborn, having discarded his identity as Galvatron and having gained new body that resembles a Dark Knight, and taken a new vehicle mode in the form of a Cybertronian jet, though how remains unspecified in the film (though it is hinted that Quintessa, the creator of Cybertronians, is responsible for his new form). He first appears when Barricade reports to him that Cade Yeager has received the talisman carried by the Cybertronian knight Steelbane. He then decides to use the TRF (Transformers Reaction Force) to lead him to Cade. Megatron also kidnaps two CIA agents to bargain for the release of a new "crew" to help him hunt Yeager. Upon meeting with William Lennox, Megatron successfully bargains for the release of Mohawk, Dreadbot, Nitro Zeus, and Onslaught (only settling for the latter after his first choice, the maniacal Berserker, is refused) to hunt Yeager and the Autobots. Megatron then goes after Cade, and attacks his hideout, but Cade and his companions lure Megatron into a trap, killing all the Decepticons except him, Barricade and Nitro Zeus. Forced to retreat, Megatron later sends Barricade after Cade and Bumblebee, but his plan is thwarted and he instead follows Cade, Bumblebee and Viviane Wembly to the submerged ship of the Knights of Iacon, where Quintessa's Staff of Life, once wielded by Merlin, is hidden. When Optimus Prime steals the staff as Nemesis Prime, Megatron steals it himself and takes it to Stonehenge, where he uses it to open a portal that will allow Quintessa to destroy the Earth (revealed to be Unicron) before killing Sir Edmund Burton and facing off against the Autobots and Optimus in battle. Megatron is eventually defeated by Optimus during the melee over the staff when he has his arm sliced off and is kicked out of Quintessa's chamber into thin air.

Animated series
After the events of the Revenge of the Fallen film, Megatron goes into hiding, orchestrating the events from Soundwave getting into NEST headquarters to Lockdown being pursued by Ratchet. Megatron finally reveals himself in Cyber Missions 4, when Optimus and Sideswipe track his spark's signal, which leads them to an abandoned warehouse. The two realize that Megatron is always one step ahead of them, and Megatron slashes at Sideswipe from behind. Megatron starts dueling Optimus, then Sideswipe joins in with him. Realizing that he is outnumbered, Megatron transforms into tank mode and shoots the roof, which collapses on Optimus and Sideswipe. Megatron gets away, but he leaves a trail of tank tread marks that lead out of the warehouse.

Megatron returns 8 episodes later in Cyber Missions #12, where he and Starscream scheme in the Arctic. He reveals to Starscream that he is aware of his ambitions and will punish him if he ever shows it again. Optimus Prime, who tracked them, soon arrives and combats them. When the rest of Optimus's team arrives, Megatron orders Starscream to take care of them, which Starscream agrees to, but not without complaint. Megatron and Starscream are simultaneously defeated, and the Decepticon commander flees after Optimus grants him mercy.

Most of the Decepticons return for the final mission, Decepticons Attack. After receiving a signal from Soundwave emitting from a bullet train, Megatron arrived on the other side of the tunnel the train was emerging from and derailed it. Ripping open one of the cars, Megatron berated Soundwave for being captured so easily, until it was revealed it was simply a hologram of his communications officer. Megatron declared it a trap, to which Optimus replied that it was a moment later. The Autobots and Decepticons battled for one last time, with Optimus telling Megatron that his alliances were made out of fear, not friendship. The Decepticons are then cornered by the human troops. Optimus Prime then demands that all Decepticons leave Earth. All of the Decepticons, including Megatron, leave Earth, but not before the commander declares that he will return.

Books
Megatron appears in the prequel novel Transformers: Ghosts of Yesterday, where it is revealed that reverse-engineering of his body has produced a spacecraft called Ghost-1. The spacecraft is sent into space in 1969, where the humans on board encounter Megatron (here referred to throughout as the "ice man"), who is briefly reanimated in the middle of a battle between the Americans and the Soviets. However, he is placed in cryo-stasis once again.

The children's book Transformers – Meet The Decepticons, by Jennifer Frantz, has a slightly different ending than the movie. This book has all six Decepticons leaving Earth together after being defeated by the Autobots, instead of having most of their numbers die.

The novelization for Transformers: Dark of the Moon ends with Megatron laying down his weapons and calling for a truce in earnest. Optimus Prime spares him and the Decepticons leave Earth to rebuild Cybertron.

In the novel, comic and video game adaptations of Revenge of the Fallen, the slightly different ending gives more depth to Megatron's relationship with the Fallen. The Fallen prepares for the final battle with Optimus Prime, it is revealed that the Fallen's promises of power to his apprentice were lies. Out of anger, Megatron betrays the Fallen and allows Optimus to kill him for good. He then flies back aboard the Nemesis to take command of the remaining Decepticon army.
In the novel version of Dark of the Moon, Optimus and Megatron work together and defeat Sentinel Prime. Though a fight was teased, Megatron reveals to Optimus he is tired of fighting, and is suing for peace. He declares he will work to restore Cybertron to its previous glory and will send for the Autobots, so that they may rebuild their planet, as brothers.

Comics

IDW Publishing
The back story of Megatron is told in both Transformers: Defiance and issue #1 of the Transformers: Movie Prequel comic. In the comics, Megatron is revealed to have co-ruled Cybertron together with Optimus Prime, serving as Lord High Protector. Megatron and Optimus learned of an alien force coming to their planet for the Allspark, just as a mysterious artifact was unearthed. Megatron is gravely injured, but the artifact (containing the Fallen) awakens and heals him, swaying him with promises of power. Megatron soon desires power over the Allspark, and under the Fallen's influence, forms the Decepticons, sending the bulk of his soldiers in a craft, the Nemesis.

The Autobots attempt to hide the Allspark, but Megatron sees through the ruse and launches a full-scale attack, during which the Allspark is launched into space. Megatron almost catches up with the Allspark as it lands on Earth. In his reckless desire to possess it, Megatron pursues it right into Earth's atmosphere and falls into the icy waters, resulting in his being frozen in stasis lock. In the late 19th century, Captain Archibald Witwicky discovers the Decepticon during an Arctic expedition. At the turn of the 20th century, a crew of men later take his body—dubbing him the "ice man"—and keep him in storage up until the present day, eventually relocating him to Hoover Dam in Nevada.

In a flashback in the movie sequel comic Transformers: The Reign of Starscream, Megatron's negative relationship with Starscream is shown to be a result of Starscream failing on a mission.

Titan Magazines
All events that take place in the alternate reality where Megatron won the battle at Mission City are in italics.

In Titan Magazines' Transformers magazine, the UK-originated strips (written by Simon Furman) reveal Megatron's actions between issues #1 and 2 of the IDW comic. Pursuing the Allspark into space following the events of Movie Prequel #1, Megatron is delayed in his pursuit by a tractor beam from Cybertron. Breaking free and attacking the culprits—Jazz, Ratchet and Ironhide—Megatron realizes that if he engages them, he would be delayed further. Summoning Devastator to deal with them, he resumes his pursuit—but the desperate gamble works and he (temporarily) loses the Allspark's trail.

The character profile the magazine provided sheds a little more light on Megatron's desire to possess the Allspark. He believes that while Cybertronians could already transform into other forms via a scanning process, the Allspark could allow Transformers to simply imagine the form they want and change accordingly. Interfacing with the Allspark directly, Megatron gains his deadly jet mode and now began his plans to obtain it permanently.

In "Twilight's Last Gleaming" part 3, Bumblebee attempts to take on Megatron in the Sector 7 base as Mikaela attempts to free Optimus Prime, but she is attacked by Frenzy. In part 4, Mikaela frees Prime and freezes Frenzy just as Autobot reinforcements arrive and assist Bumblebee in fighting Megatron.

Cybertron's Most Wanted
Yet another version of Megatron was featured in BotCon's 2015 "Cybertron's Most Wanted" storyline. This version featured a history virtually identical to that of the Megatron of the films, up until the final battle of Dark of the Moon. At this point, some force intervened to save Megatron from Optimus's killing blow, allowing Megatron to kill not only Optimus but Sentinel Prime as well. After rebuilding himself and conquering Earth, Megatron set out to reclaim Cybertron, only to be forced to contend with a new Autobot leader who proved to be an even more dangerous foe than Optimus: Rodimus Prime. Defeated and left hanging from the edge of a spacebridge, Megatron chose to abandon himself to fate rather than allow Rodimus to kill him, and wound up in the interdimensional city of Axiom Nexus, despite restrictions put in place by the Transtech to prevent versions of Megatron from taking up residence there. He soon formed a new gang of criminals including Maximal thief Packrat, Decepticon Triple-Changer Battletrap, Shattered Glass Autobot Stepper, and a trio of Microns.

Transformers Animated

Megatron's Cybertronian design hearkens to the movie version but with more human-like features, while his Earth design bears similarities to the "Super Megatron" form of his G1 incarnation. He wields his trademark fusion cannon (which is much larger than usual in this series) and carries a pair of swords. Early artwork depicted them as katana, but this was later changed. His original alternate mode is an unknown Cybertronian space vehicle but becomes a tiltrotor aircraft once he is rebuilt to blend in with Earth.

Animated series
In this series, Megatron has his own catchphrase: "Decepticons, transform and rise up!", contrasting Optimus Prime's classic "Autobots, transform and roll out!" line. A marked contrast between this and other series is that Megatron and Optimus Prime's antagonism is not personal: before their first battle, they had never met, and they continue to clash on the basis that they are on opposite sides rather than on any particular personal hatred. Megatron does not even bother to remember Optimus's name until the series finale. Unlike several other series, Megatron does not upgrade into Galvatron (though a character named Cyclonus appears in season 3 mentioning a Galvatron), he remains as Megatron for the full three seasons.

As revealed in "Transform and Roll Out", Megatron had spent 4 million stellar cycles (years) in search of the Allspark. Even though he found it, Megatron was betrayed at the beginning of the series by Starscream, who planted an explosive device on his back. Due to the explosion that crippled the Autobots craft, Megatron's lifeless body crashed on Earth, contracting "space barnacles," while his disembodied head was found in rural Michigan by a young Isaac Sumdac. Megatron's head subsequently became a keystone for Sumdac's various robotic creations, which he used to help convert Detroit into a technological metropolis within the next 50 years.

This version is less tolerant of Starscream's treachery: after gaining his new body, he uses Sari Sumdac's key to slay Starscream, and takes great pleasure in killing him several times once he discovers that Starscream has become immortal due to a shard of the Allspark embedded in his head, and he would later destroy Starscream's replacement body, moments after he got it, once the treacherous Decepticon had outgrown his usefulness. Megatron is also the most cool-headed among his other adaptations, despite being just as arrogant as his predecessors. Furthermore, he doesn't consider Optimus of any actual importance until the climactic final battle on Earth, where Megatron finally acknowledged him as a threat by name. In the end, Megatron is captured and brought to Cybertron.

After the events of the animated series, Megatron was placed in detention at the Trypticon stronghold in Kaon city. If Cyclonus is to be believed, in the far future, Megatron will become Galvatron, under unknown circumstances, and kill Oil Slick.

Transtech

The Megatron of the Transtech world works together with his world's Optimus Prime. Shockwave is one of his chief scientific researchers. Shockwave used to work for the renegade Decepticon Jhiaxus as a scientist, but after Jhiaxus was destroyed Shockwave was brought in by Megatron as a prisoner. Initially put on trial for war crimes he was freed by Megatron, who argued to Sentinel Prime that Shockwave's mind would be an invaluable asset to them.

Fun Publications
In Withered Hope Megatron and Optimus Prime heard the pleas of six Gobots whose home dimension was being destroyed, but he wasn't interested in helping them.

In Transcendent Shockwave kidnapped Breakaway to examine him under the orders of Megatron. After Shockwave discovered that certain systems in Breakaway were unique and might be useful Megatron requested permission from Transtech Ratbat to take the Autobot apart, even if it may kill him. When Alpha Trion's forces raided the lab to free Skyfall Megatron opposed them, but they escaped to another dimension.

Megatron appeared in Invasion Prologue by Fun Publications.

"Shattered Glass"

This Megatron, later called Galvatron, is a heroic mirror image of the usual Megatron character from the BotCon exclusive "Shattered Glass" comic, in which the Decepticons are on the side of good and the Autobots on the side of evil. Megatron transforms into a Cybertronian jet. He has a drone partner named Rumbler, who can act as a cannon for Megatron or form a neutronic blade weapon. After nearly being killed in an assassination attempt Megatron was rebuilt by Nexus Prime into Galvatron. According to his Tech Specs Megatron was once a young mathematician who lectured at one of Cybertron's most prestigious universities.

Fun Publications
In the Fun Publications story "Shattered Glass" Megatron recruits the Autobot Cliffjumper from an alternate reality to aid him against the Autobots of his world. He later leads an attack on the Autobot's Ark launch site. Megatron appears in "Dungeons & Dinobots", a text-based story. He defends the Arch-Ayr fuel dump from an Autobot attack. He later sends several of his troops to capture and reprogram the rogue Dinobots built by the mad Autobot scientist Wheeljack.

Megatron is captured by the Autobot Targetmasters in "Do Over", but was freed thanks to help by the Predacons and Whisper. When confronted by Optimus Prime he attempts to use the Autobot Targetmaster Nightstick to shoot the Autobot leader, but Nightstick takes control of Megatron's arm. Megatron then tricks Optimus into using Megatron's own weapon to cut Megatron's hand off, freeing him from Nightstick. Megatron misses the launch of the Decepticon ship Nemesis, which is taken over by Starscream to counter Autobot ship Ark.

In Reunification, Megatron greets a Quintesson and the dimensional travelers Breakaway, Topspin Skyfall and Landquake after their escape from the Autobot combiner Computron. Megatron introduces the travelers to Heatwave but then is shot by the traitor Cyclonus, who is working for Alpha Trion. The travelers try to combine their powers with Heatwave to return Megatron to life, but instead, have a vision of Skyfall and are combined into Nexus Prime. Nexus Prime resurrects Megatron as Galvatron. Megatron appears in a flashback in "The Coming Storm", depicting his rebirth as Galvatron by Nexus Prime.

Another character named "Megatron" would appear in the story "Shattered Destiny", the final chapter of the Beast Wars Shattered Glass comic arc. This version is a heroic counterpart to the Beast Era Megatron. Megatron is a heroic Predacon. Megatron's ship, the Darksyde, was battling the Axalon when it was pulled through an unexpected temporal and dimensional rift and crash-landed on prehistoric Earth. He and his crew disembarked to find Depth Charge outside. Megatron appears to be based on the deluxe-sized Beast Wars 10th-anniversary Megatron toy with Optimus Primal's color scheme.

Transformers: Prime

Megatron is the leader of the main group of Decepticons in the 2010 computer-animated robot superhero TV series Transformers: Prime. Megatron started out as a nameless worker, numbered D-16, who took the name Megatronus (after a "mythical" character in Cybertronian history) during his days in the Gladiator ring. His name was shortened to simply Megatron by the chanting crowds at one match, and he took it as his own unique name. He believes that Earth-style forms are beneath him, preferring to hold onto his frequently changed Cybertronian forms. After infusing Dark Energon in his system, Megatron's eyes flicker between red and purple. The Generations Megatron toy was picked at the 6th-best toy of 2010 by Topless Robot.

Animated series
Megatron was a regular character in the Transformers: Prime animated series, the main antagonist along with Unicron, and one of the main characters in War for Cybertron and Fall of Cybertron. He is the leader of the Decepticons during the Great War on Cybertron. During the Golden Age on Cybertron, Megatron named himself Megatronus, named after one of the Thirteen, Megatronus Prime. Megatronus was a gladiator in the pits of Kaon, who grew ambitious and saw corruption within the caste system and sought to put an end to it, with his own rule. Megatron began talking with his old friend, Orion Pax, who became a mentor to him. After leaving the gladiatorial arena for the political one, Megatronus saw fit to shorten his name. When "Megatron" was rejected by the Autobot High Council, he waged war on Cybertron and left the planet wasted. Now he and his long story rival, Optimus Prime, battle on the planet Earth for the control of the human planet.

Megatron's first grand plan was to invade Earth with an army of undead Terrorcons but he himself was gravely wounded, leaving Starscream in charge of the Decepticon army until he was reawakened by Bumblebee who he managed to possess for a brief time where he retook command. Megatron then, however, found himself teaming up with Team Prime, at that time, to counter the threat of Unicron. After Unicron's defeat Megatron found himself both in a mission to retrieve the Iacon relic weapons as well as keep his troops in line from various in fighting among the ranks which resulted in a few casualties and several betrayals. Eventually fighting for the restoration of Cybertron and cyberforming of Earth, which was foiled by Optimus, but Megatron had his revenge and used the Nemesis to destroy the Autobot base before setting up the new fortress of Darkmount. Shortly after the destruction of the base Megatron sent massive search parties to find the surviving Autobots and was even given a Predacon to look for them. However, Darkmount was soon destroyed by an all-out attack by the Autobots. Megatron's next plan was to create an entire army of Predacons to serve him. However, when his lone beast evolved and transformed, Megatron became fearful of what he was capable of and scrapped it. In the destruction Megatron found the means to restore Cybertron once more with Synthetic Energon, as Megatron's plan to rebuild the Omega Lock progressed, the Autobots invaded the Nemesis. As Optimus and Megatron fought, the tyrant was finally killed by Bumblebee.

The series' finale movie, Transformers Prime Beast Hunters: Predacons Rising, though "killed", Megatron was awakened by Unicron, who took possession of his body and reformatted him with new improvements upon his chassis. Unicron would then inflict eternal suffering upon the warlord as Unicron attempted to kill his brother, Primus, which would also destroy Cybertron, but was freed from the chaos lord by Optimus Prime. Megatron then regained control of his body, but then abandoned any plans of conquest, having realized the true meaning of oppression by Unicron's treatment of him. He abandons leading the Decepticons and disbands them as a military force, then flies off into space, presumably as banishment and self-imposed exile for his past actions. Optimus even stated that every sentient being, including Megatron, has the capacity to change for the better.
 
While Megatron doesn't appear in the sequel series, Transformers: Robots in Disguise, or the spin-off, Transformers: Rescue Bots, which is aimed at younger audiences, he is sometimes referenced or mentioned, tying those series into the larger continuity.

Books
Megatron appears in the short story Bumblebee at Tyger Pax By Alex Irvine. Megatron also appears in the novel Transformers: Exodus. It shows that he got his name originated from the original name of the Fallen, Megatronus Prime. He reappears in the sequels Transformers: Exiles and Transformers: Retribution. In the novels, he is portrayed as a miner originally known only by the designation D-17 who fought alongside Sentinel Prime and others in resisting the Quintesson occupation of Cybertron. However, the resulting caste system imposed on Cybertron left Megatron on the lower rungs of society, and he eventually became a gladiator. Desiring to establish a new identity for himself and reshape Cybertron, he took the name of Megatronus, which was eventually shortened to Megatron by his followers. He eventually began using his fame as a gladiator to take a political stance, crying for the lower members of Cybertronian society to rise up and claim what was rightfully theirs. In the process of this, he attracted the attention of a data clerk named Orion Pax, who contacted Megatron and began consulting with him regarding their agenda.

Megatron's followers soon began launching terrorist attacks which he denied involvement in, and he arranged through Orion to appear before the High Council of Cybertron. There Megatron argued for the destruction of the old system, while Orion called for reform; it was after their appeals that the Council renamed Orion, dubbing him Optimus Prime and charging him with seeking out the Matrix of Leadership. Enraged by this ruling, Megatron and his Decepticons declared war against Optimus and his Autobot adherents. The conflict devastated much of Cybertron, and in his quest for an advantage, Megatron learned of the existence of Dark Energon. Utilizing this new power, the Decepticons began to gain ground, and Megatron sought a means of infecting all of Cybertron with the substance to insure an unending supply. In the process, he was forced to face Sentinel Prime, whom his forces had previously held prisoner, and Starscream, who made a bid to take over the Decepticons. After mortally wounding Sentinel and humbling Starscream into continued subservience, Megatron succeeded in defeating Omega Supreme as well and infecting Cybertron with Dark Energon. The Autobots managed to remove the taint, but Optimus Prime and many of his forces departed Cybertron in the Ark to give the planet time to heal, prompting Megatron to give chase in his Nemesis battleship.

Megatron and his forces pursued the Ark to Velocitron, where he made contact with a local Decepticon faction alerted to his impending arrival by a Decepticon double-agent amongst the Autobots. Continuing on, they arrived on the planet Junkion, where they discovered the Requiem Blaster, Megatronus Prime's long-lost weapon of mass destruction. Recovering the weapon from within the planet, the Decepticons attached it to the Nemesis and engaged the Autobots in battle. However, the Requiem Blaster proved too powerful to utilize more than once, prompting the Decepticons to jettison it. After dueling Optimus Prime, who wielded the legendary Cyber Caliber, Megatron was confronted by another member of the Thirteen: Nexus Prime. During his battle with Optimus, he briefly saw into his opponent's mind and got a sense of the direction in which to seek the Allspark, a legendary artifact jettisoned from Cybertron by Optimus to keep it out of Megatron's hands. Megatron and his forces set out in search of it but ran afoul of a crew of Star Seeker pirates led by Thundertron, who engaged the Decepticons in a heated battle before withdrawing.

The supposed Allspark signal would prove to be a ruse, generated by the Quintessons to lure the Autobots and Decepticons to one of their conquered worlds. Thus, on the planet Aquatron, Megatron and Optimus were commanded to come to a peace agreement. However, this all proved to be another ruse intended to capture both factions of Transformers and use them to provide power for the Quintessons' invasion of Cybertron. Megatron and Optimus were forced into another duel and afterward drawn into the sewer-like depths of the Quintesson city. While there, Megatron discovered prophecies about himself recorded by the Sharkticons who had resisted Quintesson slavery in times past. Eventually, he realized these prophecies by taking into his body a facsimile of the Matrix of Leadership, which caused him to take on Sharkticon qualities. Leading the Sharkticons in battle, he fought against the Quintessons and sought to take over their world, only to be defeated by Quintesson-created Sharkticon General Tyrannicon, who stole the Matrix replica from him. The Autobots and Decepticons subsequently departed Aquatron, with their destinies eventually leading them to Earth.

Voice actors
Megatron is often voiced by Frank Welker, who originally voiced the G1 character, and while Hugo Weaving was chosen to voice Megatron in the first three live-action films, Welker voiced Megatron once again in supporting media and eventually inherited the role in 2017's Transformers: The Last Knight. He would later reprise his role as Megatron for the series Transformers: Prime.

The second most consistent voice actor may be David Kaye, who originally voiced the Beast Wars Predacon leader and an alternate version of the Decepticon leader in the Unicron Trilogy.

A number of other voice actors have voiced versions of Megatron such as Garry Chalk, Daniel Riordan, Corey Burton, and Fred Tatasciore, in Beast Wars as the original Megatron, Transformers: Robots in Disguise, Transformers Animated, and Transformers: War for Cybertron and the Transformers: Dark of the Moon video game, respectively.

Games
Generation 1 Megatron has appeared in numerous Transformers video games. Megatron appeared as a final boss in Transformers Battle Circuit, a simple Flash-based video game on the Hasbro web site. Megatron appeared as a playable character in the fighting games Transformers Battle Universe, a Net Jet game in which four incarnations of the character are playable, and DreamMix TV World Fighters, a crossover between various franchises including Transformers. The Generation 1 version of Megatron is offered as a downloadable character for the PlayStation 3 and Xbox 360 versions of the Transformers: Revenge of the Fallen video game. Despite being a distinct playable character, he is also summoned in gun mode by Generation 1 Starscream as an attack move.

Armada Megatron is among the characters appearing in the 2004 Transformers video game for the PlayStation 2 as a boss.

Beast Era Megatron appears in the 1999 Game Boy Color video game Kettō Transformers Beast Wars: Beast Senshi Saikyō Ketteisen. He is a playable character in the fighting games Transformers Battle Universe, a Net Jet game. He is among the licensed characters in the PC video game Beast Wars Transformers.

Movie Megatron appears in the first film's video game adaptation, Transformers: The Game. In the Autobot Campaign, Megatron appears at the last cut scene on level three being released from Hoover Dam in the Autobot campaign. He later appears as the final boss and is killed when Optimus Prime shoves the Allspark into his chest. In the Decepticon Campaign, Megatron is freed by Starscream and Blackout at the last cut scene when he goes on a rampage through the city looking for Optimus Prime, Sam and the Allspark. He is also playable on the last mission where Optimus Prime is fought as the final boss. At the end, Optimus appears dead, but is then seen sneaking up towards the Allspark. Megatron stops him in his path and kills him with his flail. He then appears in the last cut scene where he rules Earth and orders Barricade, Starscream, Blackout and Brawl to kill off the rest of the human race.

In Transformers Autobots, Megatron fulfills much of the same role as he had in the 2007 film, awakening from stasis towards the climax and ultimately being killed with the Allspark. Transformers Decepticons revolves around a power struggle between Megatron and Starscream, who had taken command in his absence. The Decepticons ultimately side with Megatron as the player-created character learns that the true meaning of being a Decepticon is loyalty to Megatron. After all of his men are killed in Starscream's bid for power, Megatron battles and kills Starscream for his treachery. Though he has lost the Allspark and his troops, Megatron is nonetheless satisfied, declaring that the weak all deserve to die and only serve to benefit the strong.

Movie Megatron is among the playable characters in the 2009 Revenge of the Fallen video game by Activision. In the game, he has two modes, Megatron (tank mode) and Megatron Flight (jetpack mode), the latter of which is only used in his fight against the Fallen after being betrayed. Megatron appears as a playable character in the fighting games Transformers Battle Universe, a Net Jet game. Megatron is among the characters who appear in the TRANSFORMERS CVBERVERSE Battle Builder Game.

Movie Megatron is one of the Decepticons featured in Transformers: The Ride at Universal Studios theme parks. In the ride, Megatron and the Decepticons invade N.E.S.T. headquarters to steal the Allspark shard, but the Autobot Evac acquires it and rushes across the city to keep it away from the Decepticons. Ultimately, in a scene similar to the end of the first film, Evac stabs Megatron in the chest with the Allspark shard, killing the Decepticon leader.

A younger version of Prime Megatron appears in the 2010 video game Transformers: War for Cybertron voiced by Fred Tatasciore. In the Decepticon Campaign, Megatron fights to return Cybertron to his version of the "golden age" by any means necessary. He discovers a source of all-powerful Dark Energon guarded by Starscream in a research station in orbit. Despite warnings from Starscream and his partner Jetfire that Dark Energon destroys all those who come into contact with it, Megatron obtains it and immerses himself in it, and uses it to power the Decepticon war effort. After Megatron corrupts the Core of Cybertron with Dark Energon, Cybertron begins shutting down to recover from the corruption in Transformers: Fall of Cybertron. Megatron blames Optimus Prime for the death of the planet, but is killed by Metroplex. After being revived by Soundwave, Megatron leads his army into space to strip Earth of its resources. Megatron also appears in Transformers: Rise of the Dark Spark, set in between War for Cybertron and Fall of Cybertron, in which he attempts to harness the power of the Dark Spark.

Toys

The Hasbro toys predate the film and animation versions of the Transformers. Through the years, there have been many toys representing the original Generation 1 incarnation of Megatron, some of which have appeared in fiction, others of which have not. Additionally, some toy makers have made unlicensed toys in his image, or accessories for the existing toys. The original 1984 Megatron toy was released in Japan as part of Takara's Microman line under the name "MC-12 Gun Robo". The toy's characteristics such as the head design and Fusion Cannon have been incorporated in other variants and incarnations of Megatron toys. Today, this toy is on a list of banned items on planes in the U.S., and a special license is required to own this toy in Australia. Despite this, Takara Tomy has reissued this toy numerous times in Japan, mostly to commemorate the anniversary of the Transformers franchise.

Due to stricter laws on toys resembling real weapons, toys of Megatron have undergone different forms of alternate modes such as tanks, cars and jets. In 2006, Hasbro released the Classics Voyager Megatron figure, which transformed into a Nerf Maverick REV-6 replica—the first Megatron toy in over two decades to have a gun mode. Megatron, Shockwave and Ravage are the three Decepticon figures available to play in the Monopoly Transformers Collectors Edition game.

Cultural legacy

 Megatron has been parodied by such shows as Frank TV, Scrubs, Robot Chicken, Drawn Together, Family Guy and Mad. Frank Welker reprised his role for some of Megatron's parodic appearances.
 Former American football player Calvin Johnson is nicknamed "Megatron".
 Prime Megatron appears as one of the Hub Carolers in a Christmas-themed commercial for The Hub.

 In 2009, a Canadian man was arrested after a three-hour standoff with police, during which he wielded only an "'80s-style" Megatron toy.
 At BotCon 2010, Hasbro named Megatron as one of the first five robot inductees in the Transformers Hall of Fame.
 Wizard magazine rated Megatron the 68th-greatest villain of all time.
 Beast Era Megatron was named the best upgrade in Beast Wars history Topless Robot. By contrast, Transmetal Megatron was voted the fourth-strangest Transformers Beast Wars figure by Topless Robot.
In 2019, American rapper Nicki Minaj released a song entitled "Megatron" in reference to her "bad guy" persona.
 In the song "The Outside" by the American band Twenty One Pilots, Megatron is referenced.

References

External links

 Megatron on IMDb
 Megatron pages on the Transformers Wiki
 G1 Megatron on the Transformers Wiki
 The MC-12 Gun Robo, Megatron's pre-Transformers incarnation as a Microman figure
 Original Patent for the MC-12 Gun Robo toy by Takashi Matsuda
 Brief Description of the G1 Megatron toy

Villains in animated television series
Extraterrestrial supervillains
Fictional aircraft
Television characters introduced in 1984
Fictional firearms
Fictional commanders
Fictional dictators
Fictional generals
Fictional gladiators
Fictional mass murderers
Fictional warlords
Fun Publications characters
Male characters in animated series
Male characters in comics
Male film villains
Male supervillains
Robotic dragons
Science fiction weapons
Robot characters in video games
Transformers characters
Video game bosses